The Ruak River is a right hand tributary of the Mekong. The mouth of the Ruak river is at the Thai-Burma border opposite Laos, a spot known as the "Golden Triangle", a popular tourist destination.

Course
The Ruak originates within the hills of the Daen Lao Range, Shan State (Burma), and becomes the boundary river between Thailand and Burma at the confluence with the Mae Sai River near the northernmost point of Thailand. It then meanders eastwards until it empties into the Mekong River at Ban Sop Ruak, Tambon Wiang, Chiang Saen District, Chiang Rai Province.

See also
Golden Triangle (Southeast Asia)

References

External links
Some Selected Wetlands in the Mekong River Basin of Thailand
Thai geography

Rivers of Thailand
Rivers of Myanmar
Geography of Chiang Rai province
International rivers of Asia
Myanmar–Thailand border
Tributaries of the Mekong River